Liǔ is an East Asian surname of Chinese origin found in China, Korea, and Japan, as well as in Vietnam and throughout Southeast Asia. It is the 60th name in the Hundred Family Surnames poem.

During antiquity, the Liu family emigrated to Korea around the Silla era, where they were given them the surname Liu. The Korean spelling of the surname is usually written in English as Ryu or Yoo. In the modern era, some Japanese people have migrated throughout East Asia and adopted the surname. In Vietnam, the name is spelled Liễu.

In ancient times, Yao people with the surname Liu emigrated from Guangdong in Guangxi to Vietnam, where the spelling of the name changed from Liu to Lieu when romanised.

Origin
The Posterity of Emperor Yi of Chu adopted the surname Liu, bearing the regional name of Liu Country in Changde, Hunan, China
Zhan Huo was given the posthumous name , thus believing that his descendents would receive the surname Liu
The ancient Miao people used the surname Liu
The ancient Yao people used the surname Liu 
During the Ming dynasty, the Yang family used the name Liu

Notable people with this name
Liu Gongquan (778–865) a Tang poet and calligrapher
Liu Zongyuan (773–819), a poet during the Tang dynasty
Liu Yizheng (1880–1956) a modern historian
Liu Zhesheng (1914-1991), ace-fighter pilot of the War of Resistance/WWII for the Chinese Air Force
Liu Chuanzhi (born 1944) Chinese businessman, founder of Lenovo
Liu Yan (born 1980), actress, singer, and television personality
Norman C.T. Liu, Chinese-American businessman, Senior Advisor at ICBC Leasing, former Chairman, President & CEO of GE Commercial Aviation Services

References

Chinese-language surnames
Individual Chinese surnames